The Canton of Goderville is a former canton situated in the Seine-Maritime département and in the Haute-Normandie region of northern France. It was disbanded following the French canton reorganisation which came into effect in March 2015. It consisted of 22 communes, which joined the canton of Saint-Romain-de-Colbosc in 2015. It had a total of 15,022 inhabitants (2012).

Geography 
An area of farming and associated light industry in the arrondissement of Le Havre, centred on the small town of Goderville. The altitude varies from 32m (Bec-de-Mortagne) to 147m (Vattetot-sous-Beaumont) for an average altitude of 113m.

The canton comprised 22 communes:

Angerville-Bailleul
Annouville-Vilmesnil
Auberville-la-Renault
Bec-de-Mortagne
Bénarville
Bornambusc
Bréauté
Bretteville-du-Grand-Caux
Daubeuf-Serville
Écrainville
Goderville
Gonfreville-Caillot
Grainville-Ymauville
Houquetot
Manneville-la-Goupil
Mentheville
Saint-Maclou-la-Brière
Saint-Sauveur-d'Émalleville
Sausseuzemare-en-Caux
Tocqueville-les-Murs
Vattetot-sous-Beaumont
Virville

Population

See also 
 Arrondissements of the Seine-Maritime department
 Cantons of the Seine-Maritime department
 Communes of the Seine-Maritime department

References

Goderville
2015 disestablishments in France
States and territories disestablished in 2015